Fred Stoller (born March 19, 1958) is an American actor, stand-up comedian and author. He is best known for portraying Gerard on Everybody Loves Raymond. He is also the voice of Stanley in the Open Season series, Fred the Squirrel in The Penguins of Madagascar, Chuck the Evil Sandwich-Making Guy in WordGirl, Jimbo in Disney Junior's Mickey and the Roadster Racers and Rusty the monkey wrench on Playhouse Disney's Handy Manny.

Early life
Stoller was born in New York City and grew up in Sheepshead Bay, Brooklyn. He has a sister, Cindy, six years his senior, and is Jewish. Stoller attended Kingsborough Community College before leaving to pursue comedy full time.

Career
Stoller had worked as a stand-up comedian in nightclubs since the early 1980s at the time of his first television appearance, in 1987, when he appeared on Stand-Up America and later on The Young Comedians Special alongside six other comedians.

He gained recognition for his frequent appearances as Gerard on the CBS sitcom Everybody Loves Raymond, Mr. Lowe in Ned's Declassified School Survival Guide and as Sheldon Singer, the son of Harold Gould's deli-owning character, on the short-lived sitcom Singer & Sons. He has also made guest appearances on several other TV series. He wrote two episodes of Seinfeld ("The Soup" and the Kramer/chimpanzee subplot of "The Face Painter"). He also appeared as Fred in the episode "The Secret Code".

Stoller is also known as the voices of Stanley in the Open Season franchise, Rusty the Wrench on Handy Manny, Fred the Squirrel in The Penguins of Madagascar, and Steve Tree in Oswald.

In 2012, Stoller published a successful e-book titled My Seinfeld Year, in which he chronicled his experiences after being hired as a new staff writer.  He has since released a book titled Maybe We'll Have You Back: The Life of a Perennial TV Guest Star, and a second e-book, Five Minutes to Kill: How the HBO Young Comedians Special Changed the Lives of 1989’s Funniest Comics, in 2017.

Filmography
 Crocodile Dundee (1986) – Uncredited
 Dumb and Dumber (1994) – Credited as "anxious man at phone"
 Ski Hard (1995) – Mel Horner
 Joe Dirt (2001) – Chemistry Teacher
 The Animal (2001) – Journalist
 Scary Movie 2 (2001) – Doctor Peterson (Uncredited, Deleted Scene)
 Like Mike (2002) – Voice only
 Austin Powers in Goldmember (2002) – Melon Guy
 Rebound (2005) – Late Carl
 Little Man (2006) – Richard
 Fall Down a School (2006–2007) – Isac "Ezac" Pine / Maciel
 Open Season 2 (2008) – Stanley
 Dr. Dolittle: Million Dollar Mutts (2009) – Fluffernufferman
 Open Season 3 (2010) – Stanley
 The Change-Up (2011) – Studio crew member in the Lorno scene
 Fred & Vinnie (2011) – Fred
 Paranormal Movie (2013) – Father Berkowitz
 Blood Lake: Attack of the Killer Lampreys (2014) – Rich
 Trouble Sleeping (2015) – Dr. Gilbert

Television
 Murphy Brown (6 episodes 1991–1996)
 Dr. Katz, Professional Therapist (5 episodes, 1995–1997)
 The Drew Carey Show (1 episode, 1995)
 Seinfeld (writer, 2 episodes, 1994–1995 & acted in 2 episodes, 1995)
 Wings (1996) – Mr. Lutz
 Science Court (1997)
 Alright Already (1997)
 Friends (1997, 2001)
 Cow and Chicken (1997)
 I Am Weasel (1997)
 The Nanny (4 episodes, 1997–1999 as Fred the Pharmacist)
 Everybody Loves Raymond (8 episodes, 1998–2003)
 Sabrina, the Teenage Witch (1 episode as "CK" in "You Bet Your Family", 1998, and 1 episode as the "Warning Guy" in a cone suit in "Sabrina the Sandman", 1999)
 The Norm Show (3 episodes, 1999)
 The King of Queens (1 episode, 2000 as Drive Thru Worker)
 Dharma & Greg (1 episode, 2001)
 Raising Dad (3 episodes, 2001–2002)
 Oswald (1 episode, as Steve Tree, 2001)
 Scrubs (2 episodes, 2002–2005)
 Monk (1 episode, Mr. Monk Goes To Office, 2005)
 All Grown Up! (3 episodes, as Mister Beeker, 2003–2006)
 Ned's Declassified School Survival Guide (8 episodes, 2004–2007 as Mr. Lowe)
 Drake & Josh (1 episode, 2005 as Lenny Spodnick)
 The Suite Life of Zack & Cody (1 episode, 2006)
 Handy Manny (88 episodes, 2006–2013) – Rusty the Monkey Wrench
 WordGirl (2007–2015; voices Chuck the Evil Sandwich Making Guy)
 Cory in the House (1 episode, 2007)
 Random! Cartoons (episode "Call Me Bessie", 2007)
 My Name Is Earl (1 episode, 2007)
 2 Girls, 1 Cup: The Show (3 episodes, 2008)
 Hannah Montana (1 episode, 2008 as Howard)
 The Penguins of Madagascar (12 episodes, 2009–2011 as Fred the Squirrel)
 The Super Hero Squad Show (1 episode, 2010) – Molecule Man
 Shake It Up (1 episode, 2011 as Sensei Ira)
 Happily Divorced (1 episode, 2011)
 Wizards of Waverly Place (8 episodes, 2010–2012 as Dexter/Gorog)
 Pound Puppies (2 episodes, 2012–2013 as Ralph)
 Anger Management (2 episodes, 2014 as Fred)
 The Haunted Hathaways (2 episodes, 2014 as Mr. Dobson)
 Dog with a Blog (1 episode, 2014 as Mr. Starr)
 Over the Garden Wall (2 episodes, 2014 as Fred the Horse)
 Bob's Burgers (2 episodes, 2012–2015 as Sal)
 K.C. Undercover (1 episode, Herb, 2015)
 Harvey Beaks (6 episodes, as Bartleburt, 2015–2016)
 Adventure Time (1 episode, as Roy the Rainicorn, 2016)
 The Mr. Peabody & Sherman Show (1 episode, as Peter Cooper, 2017)
 Mighty Magiswords (1 episode, as Bobbipher, Robot Face 1, 2017)
 The Adventures of Kid Danger (1 episode, 2018, as George Turtel)
 Mickey and the Roadster Racers (3 episodes, 2018/2019) - Jimbo (voice)
 Central Park (2 episodes, 2020) - Leo Shallenhammer (voice)
 Close Enough (2 episodes, 2020–2021) - Mr. Salt (voice)
Rick and Morty (2021)
Raven's Home (2022)
Oddballs (2022-present) - Food-Ball Joe (voice)

Written works by Stoller
 My Seinfeld Year (Kindle Single) (2012)
 Maybe We'll Have You Back: The Life of a Perennial TV Guest Star (2013)
 Five Minutes to Kill: How the HBO Young Comedians Special Changed the Lives of 1989's Funniest Comics' (Kindle Single) (2017)

References

External links

 
 
 Fred Stoller interview about his problem with confidence and self-esteem
 An Interview with Fred Stoller, Writer of My Seinfeld Year

1958 births
Living people
American male film actors
American male television actors
American male voice actors
American male writers
American stand-up comedians
Comedians from New York City
Male actors from New York City
People from Brooklyn
20th-century American comedians
21st-century American comedians
20th-century American male actors
21st-century American male actors